The Baranha or Barna, also known as Barada Barna, are an Australian Aboriginal people of northern Queensland.

Language
Their traditional language is believed to be one of the Biri dialects.

Country
Their southern frontiers were around Cotherstone. They were also present around Grosvenor Downs. The Wiri lay to their north, and their eastern flank bordered the western boundaries of the Barada.

Native Title
In July 2016, Justice John Dowsett of the Federal Court of Australia granted an application for native title determination made on behalf of the Barna people.

As part of the determination process, the Barada Barna Aboriginal Corporation was registered on 19 January 2016, and became the Registered Native Title Body Corporate (RTNBC), to hold and manage (as trustee) or manage (as agent) their native title rights and interests.

Alternative names
 Parnabal.

Notes

Citations

Sources

  

Aboriginal peoples of Queensland